Rewe (stylized as REWE) is a supermarket chain in Germany and the main brand of Rewe Group headquartered in Cologne. The name originated from an abbreviation of the original name "Revisionsverband der Westkauf-Genossenschaften" (Audit union for Westkauf-Cooperatives). With about 3,300 stores, Rewe is the second largest food retailer in Germany behind Edeka.

In 2011, the company started a delivery service with a test run in Frankfurt am Main, which was gradually expanded to locations throughout Germany. With this approach, Rewe was a pioneer in online grocery delivery within Germany. As of 2015, they have publicised plans for investing more heavily in their online presence.

Their own store brand products are branded "" (Discounter-price), "" ("Normal" price),  "" (High price, special items), "REWE Bio" (Organic), "REWE Bio + vegan" (Organic and vegan), "REWE Regional" and "REWE to go".

The Bundesliga club 1. FC Köln is sponsored by Rewe on their jerseys until the end of the 2020–21 season.

References

External links 

  

Supermarkets of Germany
english brands